Olga Szelc (born 1 May 1994 in Toruń, Poland) is a Polish figure skater. She has been starting in Ladies single category. Started skating at the age of 5.

Programs

Competitive highlights

 (nothing) = Senior level
 J. = Junior level
 N. = Novice level
 G. = Gold level

References
 
 Olga Szelc at the Polish Figure Skating Association
 Olga Szelc at the tracings.net
 Olga Szelc at the Figure Skating Online

Polish female single skaters
1994 births
Living people
Sportspeople from Toruń